Francis Alexander Caron Scrimger,  (February 10, 1880 – February 13, 1937), was a Canadian recipient of the Victoria Cross, the highest and most prestigious award for gallantry in the face of the enemy that can be awarded to British and Commonwealth forces.

Early life 
Scrimger was born in Montreal, the son of the Reverend John Scrimger, Principal of The Presbyterian College, Montreal. He was educated at the High School of Montreal and McGill University, obtaining a BA in 1901 and an MD in 1905. He was commissioned into the Royal Canadian Army Medical Corps in 1912.  His Attestation Paper for the Canadian Over-Seas Expeditionary Force states Scrimger was born 10th Feb 1881, however the 1881 Census of Canada lists Frank Scrimger as one year old in that year, hence the birth year of 1880 is correct.

Victoria Cross
During the Second Battle of Ypres on 25 April 1915 at Saint-Julien, Wieltje Salient, Belgium, Captain Scrimger, then serving as the medical officer of the 14th Battalion, Royal Montreal Regiment, was in charge of an advanced dressing station in a farmhouse near Wieltje on the St. Julien-Ypres Road. The advancing enemy were bombarding the area with an intense shelling. The German infantry were within sight. Scrimger directed the removal of the wounded under the heavy fire. Captain Scrimger and a badly wounded Captain Macdonald were the last men left at the station. Scrimger carried the wounded officer out of the farmhouse to the road. The bombardment of shell forced Scrimger to stop and place Macdonald on the road. Scrimger then protected him with his own body. During a lull in the gunfire Scrimger again carried Macdonald toward help. When he was unable to carry him any further, he remained with the wounded man until help could be obtained.

Later life 
After the war, Scrimger was appointed to the chair of Surgery at McGill and Chief Surgeon of the Royal Victoria Hospital. He died in Montreal in 1937. His only son, Captain Alexander Canon Scrimger, of the 29th Canadian Reconnaissance Regiment (South Alberta Regiment), Canadian Armoured Corps, was killed in action in Holland in 1944.

Legacy
In 1918, Mount Scrimger, a 9039-foot peak in the Canadian Rockies on the border between Alberta and British Columbia, was named after him. His medals are held at the Canadian War Museum in Ottawa after being donated by his descendants in 2005.

References

Further reading 
Monuments to Courage (David Harvey, 1999)
The Register of the Victoria Cross (This England, 1997)
VCs of the First World War - The Western Front 1915 (Peter F. Batchelor & Christopher Matson, 1999)
 "On the Battlefields", From the archives of "Maclean's Magazine", Edited by Michael Benedict, Penguin Canada, 2002 , page 100
 — (1916). Captain F.A.C. Scrimger, V.C., M.D. Can. Med. Assoc. J., 6:334-336.
 Howell, W.B. (1938). Colonel F.A.C. Scrimger, V.C. Can. Med. Assoc. J. 38: 279–281.

External links 
Francis Alexander Caron Scrimger's digitized service file
Biography at the Canadian War Museum
Francis Scrimger: Beyond the Call of Duty (book review with a brief biography of Francis Scrimger)
 Legion Magazine article on Francis Scrimger
 

1880 births
1937 deaths
Canadian World War I recipients of the Victoria Cross
Canadian military doctors
High School of Montreal alumni
McGill University Faculty of Medicine alumni
People from Montreal
Canadian Expeditionary Force officers
Anglophone Quebec people
Burials at Mount Royal Cemetery
Canadian military personnel of World War I
Royal Canadian Army Medical Corps officers
Military personnel from Montreal